Kevin Edward Barry (22 April 1936 – 16 August 2014) was a New Zealand rugby union player. A utility forward, Barry represented Thames Valley and Auckland at a provincial level, and was a member of the New Zealand national side, the All Blacks, from 1962 to 1964. He made 23 appearances for the All Blacks but did not play in any test matches.

Kevin Barry holds a unique place in New Zealand rugby history in that both his father, Ned, and his son, Liam, also played for the All Blacks: in doing so they were the first family to provide All Blacks from three successive generations.

References

1936 births
2014 deaths
Rugby union players from Lower Hutt
People educated at Sacred Heart College, Auckland
New Zealand rugby union players
New Zealand international rugby union players
Auckland rugby union players
Rugby union locks
New Zealand people of Irish descent
Thames Valley rugby union players
Rugby union flankers
Rugby union number eights